Lydia Auster (30 May 1912 in Petropavl – 3 April 1993 in Tallinn) was an Estonian composer who faced criticism for formalism by Soviet authorities.

References 

1912 births
1993 deaths
20th-century Estonian composers
Estonian women musicians
20th-century women composers